McAughtrie is a surname. Notable people with the surname include:

Craig McAughtrie (born 1981), English footballer
David McAughtrie (born 1963), Scottish footballer